William Kenrick may refer to:
William Kenrick (Member of the Barebones Parliament), MP for Kent (UK Parliament constituency)
William Kenrick (writer) (1725–1779), English novelist, playwright and satirist
William Kenrick (nurseryman) (1795–1872), American nurseryman
William Kenrick (1774–1829), English MP for Bletchingley 1806–14, Master of the King's Household 1810–12
William Kenrick (Birmingham MP) (1831–1919), Lord Mayor of Birmingham, MP for Birmingham North 1885–99